René Blanchard (born 12 July 1947) is a French ice hockey player. He competed in the men's tournament at the 1968 Winter Olympics.

References

External links
 

1947 births
Living people
Olympic ice hockey players of France
Ice hockey players at the 1968 Winter Olympics
Sportspeople from Haute-Savoie